This is a list of rural localities in Kostroma Oblast. Kostroma Oblast (Kostromskaya oblast) is a federal subject of Russia (an oblast). Its administrative center is the city of Kostroma and its population as of the 2010 Census is 667,562. It was formed in 1944 on the territory detached from neighboring Yaroslavl Oblast.

Antropovsky District 
Rural localities in Antropovsky District:

 Antropovo

Chukhlomsky District 
Rural localities in Chukhlomsky District:

 Kuznetsovo

Galichsky District 
Rural localities in Galichsky District:

 Ababkovo

Mezhevskoy District 
Rural localities in Mezhevskoy District:

 Georgiyevskoye

Oktyabrsky District 
Rural localities in Oktyabrsky District

 Bogovarovo

Ostrovsky District 
Rural localities in Ostrovsky District

 Ostrovskoye

Parfenyevsky District 
Rural localities in Parfenyevsky District:

 Parfenyevo

Pavinsky District 
Rural localities in Pavinsky District:

 Pavino

Pyshchugsky District 
Rural localities in Pyshchugsky District:

 Pyshchug

Sharyinsky District 
Rural localities in Sharyinsky District:

 Borovskoy
 Lugovoy

Sudislavsky District 
Rural localities in Sudislavsky District:

 Kuzmino
 Mirnyy
 Zapadnyy

Vokhomsky District 
Rural localities in Vokhomsky District:

 Vokhma

See also 

 
 Lists of rural localities in Russia

References 

Kostroma Oblast